Penelopides is the genus of relatively small, primarily frugivorous hornbills restricted to forested areas of the Philippines. Their common name, tarictic hornbills, is an onomatopoetic reference to the main call of several of them. They have a ridged plate-like structure on the base of their mandible. All are sexually dimorphic: males of all species are whitish-buff and black, while females of all except the Mindoro hornbill are primarily black.

Taxonomy
The genus Penelopides was introduced in 1849 by the German naturalist Ludwig Reichenbach in a plate of the hornbills. The type species was subsequently designated as the Visayan hornbill (Penelopides panini) by the English zoologist George Gray. The origin of Reichenbach's generic name is uncertain. It may be a combination of the Latin
pene meaning "almost" or "nearly", the Ancient Greek lophos meaning "crest" and -oidēs "resembling".

While the taxonomic history of the Sulawesi hornbill has been uneventful, the number of species in the Philippine Archipelago has been greatly debated. Traditionally, only a single Philippine species was recognized, the tarictic hornbill (P. panini). Following a review, it was recommended that it should be split into four allopatric species, the Visayan (P. panini), Luzon (P. manillae), Mindanao (P. affinis), and Mindoro (P. mindorensis). Today most authorities accept this split, although some have recommended splitting the Samar (P. samarensis) from the Mindanao.

The genus contains five species:

References

 Kemp, A. C. (2001). Family Bucerotidae (Hornbills). pp. 436–523 in: del Hoyo, J., Elliott, A., & Sargatal, J. eds. (2001). Handbook of the Birds of the World. Vol. 6. Mousebirds to Hornbills. Lynx Edicions, Barcelona. 

 
Bird genera

Taxa named by Ludwig Reichenbach